Darling Darling is a 2001 Indian Telugu-language romantic drama film directed by V. Samudra. A remake of the Malayalam film of the same name, the film stars Sidhant Mohapatra, Shaheen and Sai Kiran.

Cast
Sidhant Mohapatra as Chinni
Shaheen as Hema / Latha 
Sai Kiran as Kiran
Chandra Mohan as Pedarayudu
Kota Srinivasa Rao as a girl's father
M. S. Narayana
Satyanarayana
 Annapoorna
 Varsha
Gundu Hanumantha Rao 
Sudhakar

Production
Producer Medikonda Murali Krishna who produced Suryudu and Narasimha Naidu (both remakes) produced this film. 
After a string of failures, Srikanth changed his hairstyle for the film.

Release
The film was scheduled to release on Diwali. 

Jeevi of Idlebrain.com opined that "The film is one of the worst films that are made in the recent past. There is no imagination in screenplay or direction". Gudipoodi Srihari of The Hindu wrote that "Saikiran's character looks foolish. Srikant, playing a sadist role, is unimpressive, particularly in closeup shots" and that "Shaheen is a mere doll". A critic from Full Hyderabad wrote that "Darling Darling has a plot so complicated that only two persons in the cast finally understand what has happened, and those two do not include the heroine or the hero".

References

2001 films
Telugu remakes of Malayalam films
2000s Telugu-language films